The Kink Kontroversy is the third studio album by the English rock band the Kinks. It is a transitional work, with elements of both the earlier Kinks' styles (heavily blues-influenced songs such as "Milk Cow Blues" and variations on the band's power chord-driven hits from 1964–1965 such as "Till the End of the Day") and early indications of the future direction of Ray Davies' songwriting styles ("The World Keeps Going Round" and "I'm On an Island"). The liner notes were written by Michael Aldred.

Background
The album's title is a mocking reference to the notorious reputation the band had developed over the previous year, including onstage fights and concert riots in Europe, which led to a ban on the group's concerts in the United States.

"Where Have All the Good Times Gone" makes several references and/or allusions to Beatles and Rolling Stones songs.

Release
The single "Till the End of the Day" was a major hit, reaching #8 in the UK and #50 in the USA, spending eight weeks or more in each chart.

American singer Bobby Rydell covered "When I See That Girl of Mine", which was released as a single in the US a full month before the Kinks' version was made public.

Reception

AllMusic praised the album as the Kinks' coming-of-age, commenting that their raw early material was being replaced by more thoughtful and sophisticated songs. They pointed out "I'm on an Island", "Where Have All the Good Times Gone", "Ring the Bells", "The World Keeps Going Round", and "I Am Free" as particularly strong examples of this.

Legacy
American indie rock band Sleater-Kinney used the same album cover layout as an homage for their 1997 album Dig Me Out.

Track listing
All tracks are written by Ray Davies except where noted.

Side one
"Milk Cow Blues" (Sleepy John Estes)3:44
"Ring the Bells"2:21
"Gotta Get the First Plane Home"1:49
"When I See that Girl of Mine"2:12
"I am Free" (Dave Davies)2:32
"Till the End of the Day"2:21

Side two
"The World Keeps Going Round"2:36
"I'm on an Island"2:19
"Where Have All the Good Times Gone"2:53
"It's too Late"2:37
"What's in Store for Me"2:06
"You Can't Win"2:42

Personnel
According to band researcher Doug Hinman:

The Kinks
Ray Davies lead vocals, electric and acoustic guitars; harmonica ; piano ; producer 
Dave Davies backing vocals, electric guitar; acoustic guitar ; lead vocals ; co-lead vocals 
Pete Quaife bass guitar; backing vocals 
Mick Avory drums ; tambourine ; maracas ; bell )

Additional musicians and production
Clem Cattini drums 
Rasa Davies backing vocals 
Nicky Hopkins piano 
Alan MacKenzie engineer
Alan O'Duffy (credited as "Irish") assistant engineer
Shel Talmy producer; electric guitar

Charts

References

Sources 

 
 
 
 

1965 albums
The Kinks albums
Albums produced by Shel Talmy
Pye Records albums